Piers throughout the world include:

Australia

Busselton Jetty, Busselton, Western Australia. The longest wooden pier in the southern hemisphere.
Gem Pier, Williamstown, Victoria
Station Pier, Port Melbourne, Victoria
Coffs Harbour Jetty, New South Wales
Southport Pier, Gold Coast, Queensland
Shorncliffe pier, Shorncliffe, Queensland 
Urangan Pier, Hervey Bay, Queensland

Belgium
Belgium Pier, Blankenberge
Nieuwpoort Pier
Ostend Pier

Canada
Pier 21, Halifax, Nova Scotia 
White Rock Pier, White Rock, British Columbia

China
Star Ferry Pier, Central, Hong Kong
Edinburgh Place Ferry Pier, Hong Kong (now defunct)
Star Ferry Pier, Tsim Sha Tsui, Hong Kong
Tsing Yi Pier, Hong Kong
Zhanqiao Pier, Qingdao

Colombia
Puerto Colombia, Atlántico

Côte d'Ivoire
Sassandra, Western Côte d'Ivoire. The last surviving pier in West Africa

Denmark
 Langelinie Pier

Germany 

 Göhren Pier
 Sellin Pier
 Heringsdorf Pier

India
 Thalassery Pier
 Wellington Pier, Mumbai

Japan
 Ōsanbashi Pier, Yokohama
 Piers of Yokohama

Lithuania
Palanga

Mexico
 Los Muertos Pier, Puerto Vallarta

Netherlands
Scheveningen

New Zealand
New Brighton, Christchurch

Poland

Gdańsk Brzeźno
Gdynia Orłowo Pier
Jurata Pier (the part of the town of Jastarnia)
Kołobrzeg Pier
Międzyzdroje Pier
Płock Pier 
Puck
Sopot Pier - the longest wooden pier in Europe  
Miedwie

Singapore
 Marina South Pier
 Clifford Pier,  Marina Bay

Sweden
Malmö Pier

Taiwan
 Glory Pier, Kaohsiung
 Ita Thao Pier, Nantou County
 Love Pier, Kaohsiung
 Shuishe Pier, Nantou County
 Shuitou Pier, Kinmen County
 Xuanguang Pier, Nantou County

United Kingdom

United States